Germisara may refer to:
 Germisara (ancient city), an ancient Dacian and Roman settlement located in Hunedoara County, Romania
 Germisara (castra), a Roman fort in Geoagiu, Hunedoara County, Romania
 a walnut cultiva